is a city located in Ibaraki Prefecture, Japan. , the city had an estimated population of 72,351 in 28,291 households and a population density of 336 persons per km². The percentage of the population aged over 65 was 33.5%.

Geography
Ishioka is located in central Ibaraki Prefecture, approximately 70 kilometers north of central Tokyo. It is bordered by Lake Kasumigaura to the south and by mountains on all other sides. The urban area of the city is in the east.

Surrounding municipalities
Ibaraki Prefecture
 Tsuchiura
 Tsukuba
 Kasumigaura
 Kasama
 Sakuragawa
 Omitama

Climate
Ishioka has a Humid continental climate (Köppen Cfa) characterized by warm summers and cool winters with light snowfall.  The average annual temperature in Ishioka is 13.8 °C. The average annual rainfall is 1331 mm with September as the wettest month. The temperatures are highest on average in August, at around 25.8 °C, and lowest in January, at around 2.8 °C.

Demographics
Per Japanese census data, the population of Ishioka peaked around the year 2000 and has declined since.

History
During the Nara period, the provincial capital of Hitachi Province was located in what is now part of the city of Ishioka. The domain was renamed “Ishioka Domain” in 1869. With the establishment of the modern municipalities system on April 1, 1889 after the Meiji restoration, the town of Ishioka was created. Much of the town was destroyed in a fire of March 14, 1929.

Ishioka was raised to city status on February 11, 1954. The new city annexed the neighboring villages of Mi and Sekigawa on December 1, 1954.  On October 1, 2005, the town of Yasato (from Niihari District) was merged into Ishioka.

Government
Ishioka has a mayor-council form of government with a directly elected mayor and a unicameral city council of 22 members. Ishioka contributes two members to the Ibaraki Prefectural Assembly. In terms of national politics, the city is part of Ibaraki 1st district of the lower house of the Diet of Japan.

Economy
Ishioka has a diverse economy. Agriculture includes lotus roots, which are cultivated around Lake Kasumigaura, tobacco, and horticulture such as persimmons, mandarin oranges, and strawberries cultivated at the foot of Mount Tsukuba. In addition, the countryside is one of the leading rice areas in Ibaraki prefecture. Pig farming and chicken farming and dairy farming are also major agricultural contributors. The city has an industrial park, with factories owned by Panasonic and Toyo Seikan, among others. Sake brewing is a traditional local industry, as is the manufacturing of incense sticks.

Education
Ishioka has 19 public elementary schools and eight public middle schools operated by the city government, and three public high schools operated by the Ibaraki Prefectural Board of Education. There is also one private middle school and one private high school.

Transportation

Railway
 JR East – Jōban Line
 –

Highway
  – Ishioka-Omitama Smart Interchange

Local attractions
Hitachinokuni Sōshagū Shinto shrine

National Historic Monuments
site of Hitachi Kokubun-ji
site of Hitachi Kokufu ruins
Funazukayama Kofun
Kawaratsuka kiln ruins
Sakura Azumao Former Residence

Notable people from Ishioka 
Takao Watanabe, politician
Inio Asano, manga artist
Yukke, musician and bassist of Mucc
Miya, musician and guitarist of Mucc

References

External links

Official Website 

Cities in Ibaraki Prefecture
Ishioka, Ibaraki